Albret Skeel (23 November 1572 – 9 April 1639) was a Danish nobleman who held the office of Admiral of the Realm from 1616 to 1623.

Early life and travels
The son of Privy Councillor Christian Skeel, Albret Skeel was born at Fussingø on 23 November 1572. He attended Viborg School from the age of 9 and until 1585 when he was sent abroad to further his education, studying in Strasbourg, Padova and Siena before returning home by way of France and England.

Back in Denmark, Skeel was appointed squire at King Christian IV's court. In 1597 he escorted the king on his journey to Brandenburg to marry Anne Catherine of Brandenburg, and the following year the king's brother, Duke Ulrik, on a journey to France, England and Scotland.  In 1599 he was appointed royal cup-bearer and over the next few years accompanied the king on several more journeys.

In war and politics
In 1616, after distinguishing himself in the Kalmar War from 1611 to 1613, he was appointed as Admiral of the Realm and a member of the Privy Council. In 1618 he was sent on a mission to Gottorp and in 1620 to Bremen and that same year he commanded a fleet in the North Sea.

In the 1620 he embarked on criticism of Christian IV's foreign policies and, after a confrontation with the king, was forced to resign. In 1629 he was a commissioner at the peace negotiations at Lübeck, and in 1631 and 1632 he was present at the Swedish peace negotiations at Lübeck. He died on 9 April 1639 and is buried at Ribe Cathedral.

Holdings
Skeel held Riberhus as a fief from 1601 to 1627 and again from 1628 to 1639. He acquired Katholm Manor in 1616.

Family
He had the following children:
 Christen Skeel, b. 27 July 1603, Riberhus, d. 30 March 1659, Copenhagen
 Christoffer Skeel, b. 24 November 1604, Riberhus, d. 16 June 1622, Tübingen Baden-Württemberg
 Otte Skeel, b. 29 November 1605, Riberhus, d. 26 May 1644, Gjorslev Manor
 Anne Albretsdatter Skeel,   b. 24 Feb 1607, Riberhus,   d. 1662
 Margrethe Albretsdatter Skeel,  b. 1626, Riberhus,  d. 19 July 1647, Odense

References

16th-century Danish nobility
17th-century Danish nobility
16th-century Danish people
17th-century Danish people
1572 births
1639 deaths
Danish admirals
Burials at Ribe Cathedral
People of the Kalmar War
Skeel family